"The Pigeon" is the first television play episode of the first season of the Australian anthology television series Australian Playhouse. "The Pigeon" was written by Peter Finnane and directed by Eric Taylor and originally aired on ABC on 18 April 1966.

David Goddard, who produced the series, called it "a very sensitive, very moving lovely piece."

Finnane reportedly wrote another play for the series, "The Widow Thrum", but it does not appear to have been filmed.

Plot
Billy Sloane's school principal describes him as sloppy, shoddy, unpunctual, and uncooperative, but also infuriatingly truthful. Things aren't going to well for Billy, though. It's exam time at school and his mother is dying in hospital. His father has taken in a lady 'friend' to look after him and the police are looking for his brother Jack in connection with a string of armed robberies.

The only bright light in Billy's life is a sick pigeon he has found and is caring for. At least it's something he can write passionately about in his English exam. But then he's pulled out of class to be grilled about his brother by a detective. Billy's honesty is about to be put to the test.

Cast
 Ross Thompson as Billy
 Moya O'Sullivan
 Don Philips
 Vaughan Tracey as the headmaster
 John Gregg
 Kenneth Haigh as the police sergeant
 Lynne Murphy as Billy's mother

Production
Peter Finnane was an English master at a Sydney High School.

Reception
The Sydney Morning Herald encouraged audiences to take a hard line when watching Australian Playhouse and said "The Pigeon" "was certainly worth 30 minutes of your time."

The Canberra Times called it "excellent". Another critic called it "a tight half hour".

The Age said Finnane "might have made it something other than a shameless weepie if he had been more sparing with its ingredients." A later review in the same paper praised Thompson's acting but felt "some dialogue didn't ring true." Another writer in the same paper called it "promising".

The Bulletin said it had "a mixture of new talent, experienced  players, and several  very shaky ones."

The Sydney Morning Herald said "although it tried to pack a bit overmuch into 30 minutes it was a sensitively written study."

References

External links
 
 
 

1966 television plays
1966 Australian television episodes
1960s Australian television plays
Australian Playhouse (season 1) episodes